The D-3 was a Soviet motor torpedo boat (MTB) design built before and during World War II. One boat was captured by the Finns and operated by them before it had to be returned to the Soviets after the Moscow Armistice in 1944. After the war, two vessels were exported to Poland in 1946.

Design and development
In 1935 the Soviet Navy begun working on larger MTBs that possessed higher endurance than the previous numerous G-5 class. The D-3 class was the most successful of the four designs considered, built in wood, and carrying torpedoes openly, in contrast with the smaller G-5 (being metallic and carrying torpedoes into troughs set of the rear deck).

Production
The production differentiated in two main series.
26 boats built between 1940 and 1941 possessed a noticeable lower speed.
47 boats built between 1943 and 1945 could reach up  thanks improved engines.

Variants
Of the other variants originally designed, the wooden D-2 and the steel SM-3 and SM-4, none saw mass-production even if the prototype of SM-3 saw active service during World War II in Black Sea.

Service history
In Baltic Sea the Finnish Navy captured the boat TK-52 in October 1941, after she was found grounded due a storm. She was named Vasema and used as motor torpedo boat until 1943 before operating as patrol vessel. She was returned to the Soviet Navy in 1944.
The most notable naval Soviet success of the class was the participation at the Battle of Nerva Island where the Elbing-class large torpedo boat T-31 sunk.

In Black Sea the D3 class never operated in large numbers, only the original D-3 prototype was active alongside the steel-built SM-3 prototype. Both vessels were however quite active, sinking the italian midget submarine CB-5 and the German barge F-334 in 1942 , while SM-3 sank another barge in 1944 alongside G-5 boats during the Crimean offensive.

In Arctic, the D3 class boat TK-12 was successfully led by Aleksandr Shabalin who later become detachment commander of his unit and was decorated twice as Hero of the Soviet Union.

Notes

External links
 details of the two main series
 brief listing of each D-3

Motor torpedo boats of the Soviet Navy